The Dormition Cathedral in Vladimir (sometimes translated Assumption Cathedral) (Sobor Uspeniya Presvyatoy Bogoroditsy) was a mother church of Medieval Russia in the 13th and 14th centuries. It is part of a World Heritage Site, the White Monuments of Vladimir and Suzdal.

The cathedral was commissioned by Andrew the Pious in his capital, Vladimir, and dedicated to the Dormition of the Theotokos (Virgin Mary), whom he promoted as the patron saint of his lands. Originally erected in 1158 to 1160, the cathedral, with six pillars and five domes, was expanded in 1185 to 1189 to reflect the augmented prestige of Vladimir. At 1178 m², it remained the largest Russian church for several hundred years.

Andrew the Pious, Vsevolod the Big Nest and other rulers of Vladimir-Suzdal were interred in the crypt of this church. Unlike many other churches, the cathedral survived the great devastation and fire of Vladimir in 1239, when the Mongol hordes of Batu Khan took hold of the capital.

The exterior walls of the church are covered with elaborate carvings. The interior was painted in the 12th century and then repainted by Andrei Rublev and Daniil Chernyi in 1408. The Dormition Cathedral served as a model for Aristotele Fioravanti, when he designed the eponymous cathedral in the Moscow Kremlin in 1475 to 1479. A lofty belltower, combining genuine Russian, Gothic and Neoclassical influences, was erected nearby in 1810.

External links
 Tourism portal of the Vladimir region, Russia
 

White Monuments of Vladimir and Suzdal
Russian Orthodox cathedrals in Russia
Churches in Vladimir Oblast
Buildings and structures in Vladimir, Russia
Vladimir-Suzdal
12th-century Eastern Orthodox church buildings
Vladimir-Suzdal Museum Reserve
Medieval Eastern Orthodox church buildings in Russia
Church buildings with domes
Burial sites of the Rurik dynasty
Burial sites of the House of Yurievichi
Churches completed in 1189
12th-century churches in Russia
Cultural heritage monuments of federal significance in Vladimir Oblast